The 315 Project – Citizens for Truth (פרויקט 315) is a volunteer-based project in Israel whose main purpose is to investigate the nature and content of 315 news publications stated in the indictment of the case-4000 trial. The publications are stated in relation to Benjamin Netanyahu (former Israeli prime-minister) who is accused of receiving 'unusual responsiveness' during the runup to their publication at the Israeli news portal Walla!. 
The 'unusual responsiveness' related to the 315 online publications is claimed to constitute a bribe by Israeli state prosecutors in the case. The project's main aim is to investigate the truthfulness and validity of the prosecutors' claims related to the publications.
The project was initiated by Israeli entrepreneur and social activist Guy Levy.

Background
The original indictment in the case (given the number 4000) was presented to the district court of Jerusalem on 28 January 2020, and included the charges of "bribery, fraud and breach of trust". However, on December 14 of the same year the court requested the prosecution to correct the indictment due to essential flaws. In total the state attorney was requested to correct 50 clauses. In relation to the bribe clause, the state attorney was requested to add an addendum detailing all the press events related to the claim that Benjamin Netanyahu requested more favorable coverage from the online Walla! news portal (the original bribe was defined as ‘positive press coverage’).
In the corrected indictment of case-4000, the bribery clause was modified to describe 'unusual responsiveness' as the bribe instead of positive press coverage, and the addendum added by the state attorney included 315 cases which were claimed to constitute the bribe.

Project origins
Guy Levy, a publicist and social activist, read the indictment's addendum after its public release. During the examination it came to his attention that case num. 11 in the addendum described a request to cover an Israeli Forbes article nominating Sarah Netanyahu (wife of Benjamin Netanyahu) as the most powerful woman in Israel. Levy recalled that the Forbes article was also covered by Channel 2’and that the story's coverage by Walla was not unusual. It was later revealed that the content at Walla was hostile in nature, that the story was covered by at least 17 press outlets, and that Walla had been covering the Forbes annual ‘most powerful woman’ nomination for a number of years. This led to the conclusion that case num. 11 (out of 315) wasn't scrutinized by the state attorney's office, which led to examination of additional cases.

Guy Levy joined forces with Moshik Kovarsky, Dr. Adi Szabo, Moshe Mallal, and dozens of volunteers to thoroughly scrutinize all 315 cases included in the indictment addendum. The project's team uncovered cases where the state attorney claimed that requests to retract publications had been accepted, where in reality the publications remained online indefinitely. In other cases where the state attorney claimed that story coverage requests were accepted, it was revealed that the stories weren't covered at all by Walla. In other cases, claims that editing requests were fulfilled by the site, turned out to not have occurred. In one case, it was even revealed that a presumed demand to retract a publication was not related to Benjamin Netanyahu, but to the Israeli former politician Silvan Shalom. 

Other publication requests that were accepted appeared in dozens of other news outlets simultaneously, and were mainly regular spokesman announcements.

Project activity

Video media
The project's members filmed 30 video clips where each video describes a case or a number of cases out of the 315 indictment cases, and their refutation. Additionally, other subjects are discussed in the clips such as the phenomenon of demands for positive coverage at Walla by other politicians, and other issues related to the press-dubbed ‘thousands cases’.

Case 4000
The project's members transferred their findings to the defense team of the case-4000 trial, and to a media company which confirmed the findings. Some of the findings were used during cross examinations of prosecution witnesses, and the complete project file was submitted to the trial's judges.

Findings
The findings proved that the state prosecution team did not examine the vast majority of 315 cases added to the indictment. The cases were claimed to constitute a bribe due to ‘unusual responsiveness’ related to their publication: 
In 136 cases it was claimed that publication requests by Netanyahu were accepted, where in reality no such publications occurred. 
In 155 cases it was claimed that the responsiveness of the Walla site to Netanyahu's requests were ‘unusual’. However it was proved that such requests were routinely accepted by many other press outlets, or that they had already been covered by the press in the past.
In 13 cases Benjamin Netanyahu was not involved, despite opposite claims in the indictment. 
In 5 cases, the number of details was insufficient in order to establish whether responsiveness existed and whether it was ‘unusual’.
In 6 cases, requests sent by Netanyahu were accepted exclusively by Walla.

Prominent project members
 Guy Levy – publicist and social activist
 Dr. Adi Szabo – psychology specialist
 Moshik Kovarsky – serial entrepreneur and engineer in high-tech industry
 Moshe Malal – engineer in high-tech industry

External links

References

Benjamin Netanyahu